Centema is a genus of flowering plants belonging to the family Amaranthaceae.

Its native range is Southern Tropical and Southern Africa.

Species:

Centema angolensis 
Centema subfusca

References

Amaranthaceae
Amaranthaceae genera